Giuseppe Fezzardi (born 28 December 1939) is a retired Italian professional road bicycle racer, who competed professionally between 1961 and 1972. He won the 1962 Tre Valli Varesine and 1963 Tour de Suisse. Fezzardi rode the 1965 and 1966 Tour de France and won the 15th stage in 1965.

References

External links 

Official Tour de France results for Giuseppe Fezzardi

Italian male cyclists
1939 births
Living people
Italian Tour de France stage winners
Cyclists from the Province of Varese